Gayatri (Sanskrit: गायत्री, IAST:Gāyatrī) is the personified form of the Gayatri Mantra, a popular hymn from Vedic texts. She is also known as Savitri, and bears the epithet of Vedamata (mother of the Vedas). Gayatri is often associated with Savitr, a solar deity in the Vedas. According to the Skanda Purana, Gayatri is another name of Saraswati, and is the consort of Brahma. Shaivite texts identify Mahagayatri as the consort of Shiva, in his highest form of Sadasiva, with five heads and ten hands.

Origin 
Gayatri was the name initially applied to a metre of the Rig Veda consisting of 24 syllables. In particular, it refers to the Gayatri Mantra and the Goddess Gāyatrī as that mantra personified. The Gayatri mantra composed in this triplet form is the most famous. Most of the scholars identify Gayatri as the feminine form of Gayatra, another name of the Vedic Solar god which is also one of the synonyms of Savitri and Savitr.

According to the Puranas, Gayatri was an Abhira girl who helped Brahma in a Yajna performed in Pushkara.

Iconography

Early bronze images of Gayatri appear in the Himachal Pradesh, where she was revered as the consort of Sadasiva. Some of these forms are terrific in nature. One of the bronze images of Gayatri dated back to 10th century CE was obtained from Champa region and now preserved in Delhi museum. It appears with five faces and ten hands holding, sword, lotus, trident, disc, skull, Varada in left and goad, noose, a manuscript, the jar of ambrosia and Abhaya in right. She resides in the mount Nandi. Modern depictions illustrates swan as her mount. Old iconography of Shaivite Manonmani Gayatri was misunderstood as the same of Brahmanic Gayatri later and paintings of Gayatri appears from 18th century CE in which she is often portrayed with third eye, crescent moon and five heads with five different colors same like Sadasiva.

The well known form of Gayatri (Parvati) with the Saivite influence appears having five heads (Mukta, Vidruma, Hema, Neela, Dhavala) with the ten eyes looking in eight directions plus the earth and sky, and ten arms holding various types of weapons attributed to Shiva, Vishnu, and Brahma. Another recent depiction is accompanied by a white swan holding a book to portray knowledge in one hand and a cure in the other, as the goddess of learning. She is also depicted four-armed, seated on a swan, holding weapons symbolising the Trimurti: The Vedas of Brahma, the discus of Vishnu, the trident of Shiva, and Varada mudra.

She also has an fearsome three-faced depiction; two faces look like that of goddess Kali and one clam one and holding weapons like the deity Mahakali. She is shown mounted on a lotus holding lotus, noose, trident, Scimitar and vard mudra in right whereas conch, discus, bow-arrow, goad and abhaya mudra in left.

Associations

As mentioned in Taittiriya Sandhya Bhashyam, the three feet of Gayatri is supposed to represent the first 3 vedas (Ṛk, Yajus, Sāma). The six bellies are supposed to represent 4 cardinal directions, along with the two more directions, Ūrdhva (Zenith) and Adhara (Nadir). The five heads represent 5 among the Vedangas, namely, vyākaraṇa, śikṣā, kalpa, nirukta and jyotiṣa.

By citing from Gayatri Tantra, the text Mantramahārṇava gives the significance of Gayatri's 24 letters and its representation that are given below.

24 Letters of Gayatri mantra
Gayatri mantra has 24 letters. That is why it called as  gāyatrī caturviṃśatyakṣarā (Sanskrit: गायत्री चतुर्विंशत्यक्षरा). They are 1.tat, 2.sa, 3.vi, 4.tur, 5.va, 6.re, 7.ṇi, 8.yaṃ, 9.bhar, 10,go, 11.de, 12.va, 13.sya, 14.dhī, 15.ma, 16.hi, 17.dhi, 18.yo, 19.yo, 20.naḥ, 21.pra, 22.co 23.da and 24.yāt.

When counting the letters, the word vareṇyam is treated as vareṇiyam. But, while chanting, it ought to be chanted as vareṇyam only.

24 Rishis of Gayatri
The 24 Letters of Gayatri mantra represents 24 Vedic Rishis. They are: 1.vāmadeva, 2.atri, 3.vaśiṣṭha, 4.śukra, 5.kaṇva, 6.parāśara, 7.viśvāmitra, 8.kapila, 9.śaunaka, 10.yājñavalkya, 11.bharadwāja, 12.jamadagni, 13.gautama, 14.mudgala, 15.vyāsa, 16.lomasa, 17.agastya, 18.kauśika, 19.vatsa, 20.pulastya, 21.manḍūka, 22.dūrvāsa, 23.nārada, and 24.kaśyapa.

24 Meters of Gayatri
The 24 Letters of Gayatri mantra represent 24 Vedic Meters (i.e. Chandas). They are: 1.gāyatri,  2.uṣnik, 3.anuṣṭubh, 4.bṛhati, 5.paṃkti, 6.triṣṭubh, 7.jagati, 8.atijagati, 9.śakvari, 10.atiśakvari, 11.dhṛti, 12.atidhṛti, 13.virāṭ, 14.prastārapaṃkti, 15.kṛti, 16.prakṛti, 17.akṛti, 18.vikṛti, 19.saṃskṛti, 20.akṣarapaṃkti, 21.bhūḥ, 22.bhuvaḥ, 23.swaḥ, 24.jyotiṣmati.

24 Vedic Devatas of Gayatri
The 24 Letters of Gayatri mantra represent 24 Vedic Devatas. They are: 1.agni, 2.prajāpati, 3.soma, 4.īśāna, 5.savitā, 6. āditya, 7.bṛhaspati, 8. maitrāvaruṇa 9.bhaga, 10.āryamaan, 11.gaṇeśa, 12.tvaṣṭā, 13.pūṣā, 14. indrāgni, 15.vāyu, 16.vāmadeva, 17.maitrāvaruṇi 18. viśvedevā, 19. mātṛkā, 20.viṣṇu, 21.vasu, 22. rudra, 23.kubera and 24.aśvins

The Padmapurana (in Sṛṣṭi Kānḍa) mentions 24 Adhi-Devatas (presiding deities) for each of the 24 letters of Gayatri mantra. They are 1.agni, 2.vāyu, 3.sūrya, 4.ākāśa, 5.yama, 6.varuṇa, 7.bṛhaspati, 8.parjanya, 9.indra, 10.gandharva, 11.pūṣā, 12. mitra, 13.tvaṣṭā, 14.vasu, 15.marut, 16.soma, 17.āṅgiras, 18.viśvedevā, 19.aśvins, 20.prajāpati, 21.akṣara (tattva), 22.rudra, 23.brahma and 24.viṣṇu.

The Yoga yājñavalkya mentions 24 Devatas for each of the 24 letters of Gayatri mantra. They are 1.agni, 2.vāyu, 3.sūrya, 4.īśāna, 5.āditya, 6.āṅgiras, 7.pitri, 8.bharga, 9.āryamān, 10.gandharva, 11.pūṣā, 12. maitrāvaruṇa, 13.tvaṣṭā, 14.vasu, 15.vāmadeva, 16.maitrāvaruṇi, 17.jñeya, 18.viśvedevā, 19.viṣṇu, 20.prajāpati, 21.sarvadevā, 22.kubera, 23.aśvins and 24.brahma.

24 Śaktis of Gayatri
The 24 Letters of Gayatri mantra represent 24 Śaktis. They are: 1.vāmadevī, 2.priyā, 3.satyā, 4.viśwabhadrā, 5.vilāsinī, 6.prabhāvatī, 7.jayā,  8.śantā, 9.kāntā, 10.durgā, 11.saraswatī, 12.vidrumā, 13.viśālesā, 14.vyāpinī, 15.vimalā, 16.tamopahārini, 17.sūkṣmā, 18.viśwayoni 19.jayā, 20.vaśā, 21.padmālayā,  22.parāśobhā, 23.bhadrā, and 24. tripadā.

24 Tattvas of Gayatri

The 24 Letters of Gayatri mantra represent 24 Tattvas. They are 
 Five Bhūtas, namely, pṛthivi (Earth), apas (Water), agni (Fire), vāyu (Air) and ākāśa (Sky).
 Five Tanmātras, namely, gandha (smell), rasa (taste), rūpa (form), sparśa (touch) and śabda (sound).
 Five Karmendriyas (i.e. motor organs), namely, upasthā (sexual organ), pāyu (anus), pāda (leg), pāni (hand) and vāk (mouth).
 Five Jñānendriyas (i.e. sense organs), namely, ghrāna (nose), jihvā (tongue), caksus (eye),  (skin) and śrotra (ear).
 Four Vāyus (air), namely, Prāṇa, Apāna, Vyāna and Samāna

However, in classical definition of 24 tattvas, the last four are the antahkaranas (i.e. sense organs), namely, manas (mind), buddhi (intellect), citta (state of mind) and ahaṅkāra (ego).

The Mudras of Gayatri

The Gayatri mantra represents some mahāmudras (great hand gestures). They are 1. sumukha, 2. sampuṭa, 3. vitata, 4. visṛta, 5. dvimukha,  6. trimukha,  7. catuḥ, 8. pañcamukha, 9. ṣaṇmukha, 10. adhomukha,  11. vyāpakāñjali, 12. śakaṭa, 13. yamapāśa, 14. grathita, 15. sanmukhonmukha, 16. vilamba, 17. muṣtika,  18. matsya, 19. kūrmah 20. varāhaka, 21. simhākrānta, 22. mahākrānta, 23. mudgara, 24. pallava, 25. triśūla, 26. yoni, 27. surabhi, 28. akṣamāla, 29. linga, 30. ambuja.

Since, the first 24 are used before Gayatri Japa, they are traditionally referred as Pūrva Mudras.

Legends 

In some Puranas, Gayatri is said to be the other names of Sarasvati, the wife of Brahma. According to the Matsya Purana, Brahma's left half emerged as a female, who is celebrated under the names of Sarasvati, Savitri, and Gayatri. In Kurma Purana, Gautama rishi was blessed by Goddess Gayatri and able to eliminate the obstacles he faced in his life. The Skanda Purana writes that Gayatri is married to Brahma, making her a form of Saraswati.

A few Puranic scriptures say that Gayatri is distinct from Sarawati and is married to Brahma. According to the Padma Purana, Gayatri is an Abhira girl who helps Brahma in the performance of yajna in Pushkara.

According to some texts, Brahma's first wife is Savitri, and Gayatri is the second. The story goes that Savitri became angry knowing the wedding of Gayatri with Brahma, and cursed all the gods and goddesses engaged in the event.

However, the Padma Purana narrates the same story with some modifications. After Savitri was appeased by Brahma, Vishnu, and Lakshmi, She accepts Gayatri, an Abhira as her sister happily.

Gayatri further developed into a fierce goddess who could even slay a demon. According to Varaha Purana and Mahabharata, Goddess Gayatri slew the demon Vetrasura, the son of Vritra and river Vetravati, on a Navami day.

Shaivism 
 Shaivism sees Gayatri as the consort of eternal blissful absolute Parashiva who manifests in the form of Sadasiva. Sadashiva's consort Manonmani is none other than the mantra form of Gayatri, who possess the power of her husband Bharga, within her. The popular form of Gayatri with five heads and ten arms was initially found in Saivite iconographies of Manonmani in North India beginning from 10th century CE. The Saivite view on Gayatri seems a later development from the combination of vedic practice of Gayatri reverence and its Saivite inclusion as a manifestation of Shakti. This could be the root for the sublime aspect of Gayatri explained in the later puranas as the killer of demon Vetra identifying her with Adi Parashakti.

See also 
 Gayatri Mantra
 Saraswati
 Gaia

References

Notes

External links 
 Goddess Gayatri
 Hindu Goddess gayatri

Hindu goddesses
Names of God in Hinduism
Forms of Parvati
Consorts of Shiva